Dudak may refer to:

 Dūdak, the village of Dudej, Zarqan in Iran
 Dudák, a Czech card game